Revenue Retrievin': Night Shift is the twelfth studio album by American rapper E-40. It was released on March 30, 2010, which was the same day that E-40's Revenue Retrievin': Day Shift was released.

Night Shift features 19 tracks including guest appearances from Snoop Dogg, Too Short, Ya Boy, Bobby V, Keak da Sneak, San Quinn and many others. With this album, E-40 was the first hip hop artist to release two major studio albums on the same day since Nelly released Sweat and Suit in 2004.

Music videos have been filmed for the songs "Over the Stove", "Nice Guys", "Can't Stop the Boss" featuring Snoop Dogg, Too Short, and Jazze Pha, "Show Me What You Workin' Wit'" featuring Too Short, "He's a Gangsta" featuring Messy Marv, The Jacka of Mob Figaz, and Kaveo, "Spend the Night" featuring Laroo, the DB'z, Droop-E, and B-Slimm, and "The Server". The latter would be released as a promo single on February 23, 2010, to iTunes.

Commercial performance
In its first two weeks Revenue Retrievin': Night Shift sold 57,000 copies. It has sold 106,000 copies as of May 3, 2010.

Track listing

Notes
 Stressmatic is not credited "Over the Stove" and "Prepared"
 Laroo is uncredited in "Over the Stove"
 YV is uncredited in "More Bass, More Treble"

Sample credits
"Show Me What You Workin' Wit'" - contains a sample of "Love Is the Answer" by The Stylistics
"Stilettos & Jeans" - contains a sample of "Gucci Time" by Schoolly D
"Spend the Night" - contains a sample of "Oceania" by Björk

Charts

Weekly charts

Year-end charts

References

2010 albums
E-40 albums
Jive Records albums
Albums produced by Rick Rock
Albums produced by Jazze Pha
Albums produced by Tha Bizness
Albums produced by Droop-E